Luca Bittante (born 14 August 1993) is an Italian footballer who plays for  club Monterosi.

Club career
Born in Bassano del Grappa, Bittante finished his youth career with Fiorentina, but left without making a first-team appearance, signing a co-ownership deal with Avellino.

On 24 August, Bittante made his Serie B debut, starting in a 2–1 home success over Novara.

On 19 June 2014, Fiorentina and Avellino renewed the co-ownership for another year.

On 3 February 2023, Bittante signed with Monterosi in Serie C.

References

External links

1993 births
People from Bassano del Grappa
Sportspeople from the Province of Vicenza
Footballers from Veneto
Living people
Association football defenders
Italian footballers
Italy youth international footballers
ACF Fiorentina players
U.S. Avellino 1912 players
Empoli F.C. players
Cagliari Calcio players
U.S. Salernitana 1919 players
A.C. Carpi players
Cosenza Calcio players
Monterosi Tuscia F.C. players
Serie A players
Serie B players
Serie C players